Sir Francis John Bagott Watson,  (24 August 1907 – 27 September 1992) was a British art historian.

Education 
Watson was educated at Shrewsbury and St John's College, Cambridge.

Career 
Watson served as Director of the Wallace Collection from 1963 to 1974, and as Surveyor of the Queen's Works of Art from 1963 to 1972.

Watson was Slade Professor of Fine Art at the University of Oxford, 1969–70.

References

1907 births
1992 deaths
British art historians
Surveyors of the Queen's Works of Art
People educated at Shrewsbury School
Alumni of St John's College, Cambridge
Slade Professors of Fine Art (University of Oxford)
Knights Commander of the Royal Victorian Order
Fellows of the British Academy
20th-century British historians